João Magalhães Hueb de Menezes (born 17 December 1996) is a Brazilian professional tennis player.

Menezes has a career-high ATP singles ranking of 172 achieved on 17 February 2020. He also has a career high doubles ranking of 488 achieved on 3 February 2020.

Menezes has won 1 ATP Challenger singles title at the 2019 Samarkand Challenger as well as a total of 12 ITF Futures titles (5 singles and 7 doubles).

Menezes won the gold medal at the 2019 Pan American Games in Lima, defeating Chilean Tomás Barrios in the final.

He qualified to represent Brazil at the 2020 Summer Olympics.

Junior Grand Slam finals

Doubles: 1 (1 runner-up)

Performance timelines

Singles
Current through the 2022 French Open.

Davis Cup 

   indicates the outcome of the Davis Cup match followed by the score, date, place of event, the zonal classification and its phase, and the court surface.

Challenger and Futures finals

Singles: 10 (6–4)

Doubles: 10 (8–2)

References

External links
 
 

1996 births
Living people
Brazilian male tennis players
People from Uberaba
Pan American Games gold medalists for Brazil
Pan American Games medalists in tennis
Tennis players at the 2015 Pan American Games
Tennis players at the 2019 Pan American Games
Medalists at the 2019 Pan American Games
Olympic tennis players of Brazil
Tennis players at the 2020 Summer Olympics
Sportspeople from Minas Gerais
20th-century Brazilian people
21st-century Brazilian people